Camille Tournier was a French cross-country skier. He competed in the men's 50 kilometre event at the 1928 Winter Olympics.

References

Year of birth missing
Year of death missing
French male cross-country skiers
Olympic cross-country skiers of France
Cross-country skiers at the 1928 Winter Olympics
Place of birth missing